The franc was the currency of Lucca, issued between 1805 and 1808. It was equivalent to the French franc, alongside which it circulated, and was subdivided into 100 centesimi. In 1808, the French franc replaced local coins at par.

See also Luccan lira

Coins
In 1805, silver 1 and 5 franc coins were introduced, followed by copper 3 and 5 centesimi in 1806.

Currencies of Italy
Modern obsolete currencies
1805 establishments in Italy
1808 disestablishments in Europe
1805 in Italy
1808 in Italy
19th-century economic history
19th century in Italy
1800s economic history
Lucca